Ennio Fantastichini (20 February 1955 – 1 December 2018) was an Italian actor.

Life and career
Born in Gallese, province of Viterbo, Fantastichini studied acting at the Accademia Nazionale di Arte Drammatica Silvio D'Amico. His breakout role was Tommaso Scalia in Gianni Amelio's Open Doors, a role that gave him a Nastro d'Argento, a Ciak d'oro and a special European Film Award as European Discovery of the Year. In 2010, for his performance in Ferzan Özpetek's Loose Cannons, he won a David di Donatello for best supporting actor and a second Nastro d'Argento in the same category.

Fantastichini died of acute promyelocytic leukemia in Naples on 1 December 2018, at the age of 63.

Selected filmography

1983: Fuori dal giorno
1984: Il ragazzo di Ebalus - Terrorist
1985: Big Deal After 20 Years - Domenico
1988: The Camels - Pino
1989: Via Panisperna Boys - Enrico Fermi
1990: Open Doors - Tommaso Scalia
1990: A Violent Life - Cosimo De Medici
1990: The Station - Danilo
1991: The Professional Secrets of Dr. Apfelgluck - Alain
1991: A Simple Story - Police Chief
1991: 18 anni tra una settimana - Nicola
1991: Mezzaestate
1992: Caldo soffocante - Giuliano Ferrini
1992: Gangsters - Giulio
1993: La bionda - Alberto
1994: The True Life of Antonio H.
1995: Vendetta - Don Tommaso
1996: August Vacation - Ruggero Mazzalupi
1997: Arlette - Angelo Mascarpone
1997: Other Men - Loris Corbi
1997: Commercial Break - Giulio Stucchi
1998: Viol@ - Mittler (voice)
1998: Vite in sospeso - Dario
1998: Per tutto il tempo che ci resta - Judge Giorgio Nappi
1999: Il corpo dell'anima - Mauro
1999: Senza movente - Toni Aragona
2000: Against the Wind - Leo
2000: Joseph of Nazareth (TV Movie) - Herodes
2000: St. Paul the Apostle - (TV Movie) - Peter
2001: Come si fa un Martini - Paolo
2002: Sei come sei (2002) - Nico ("Appuntamento al buio")
2002: Rosa Funzeca - Capitone
2002: Napoléon (TV Mini-Series) - Joseph Bonaparte
2003: At the End of the Night - Bruno
2005: Karol: A Man Who Became Pope (TV Movie) - Maciej Nowak
2007: Saturn in Opposition - Sergio
2007: Night Bus - Carlo Matera
2007: Prova a volare - Pietro
2007: Peopling the Palaces at Venaria Reale - Marchese di Caraglio
2008: Two Fists, One Heart - Joe Argo
2009: Fort Apache Napoli - Sindaco Cassano
2009: The Red Shadows - Varga
2009: I, Don Giovanni - Antonio Salieri
2009: Purple Sea - Salvatore
2009: La cosa giusta - Duccio Monti
2009: Il mostro di Firenze (TV Mini-Series) - Renzo Rontini
2010: Loose Cannons - Vincenzo Cantone
2011: All at Sea - Il suicida
2011: The Arrival of Wang - Curti
2012: Cherry on the Cake - M. Faysal
2012: Il pasticciere - Avvocato
2012: Breve storia di lunghi tradimenti - Gianfilippo Brandi
2013: Studio illegale - Giuseppe Sobreroni
2013: The Move of The Penguin - Ottavio
2014: Do You Remember Me? - Amedeo
2014: Do You See Me? - Dr. Ripamonti
2015: Me, Myself and Her - Sergio
2016: La stoffa dei sogni - De Caro
2016: Caffè - Enrico
2017: Una famiglia - Giorgio
2017: The Music of Silence - zio Giovanni
2018: Fabrizio De André - Principe libero - Giuseppe De André
2019: Lontano Lontano - Attilio (Posthumous release and final film role)

References

External links

1955 births
2018 deaths
People from the Province of Viterbo
Italian male stage actors
Nastro d'Argento winners
Italian male film actors
Italian male television actors
David di Donatello winners
Ciak d'oro winners
Accademia Nazionale di Arte Drammatica Silvio D'Amico alumni
European Film Awards winners (people)
Deaths from cancer in Campania
Deaths from acute myeloid leukemia